Polythlipta camptozona is a moth of the family Crambidae. It is found in Rwanda, Uganda, Zambia and Zimbabwe.

References
 afromoths

Moths described in 1910
Spilomelinae